Shea Martin Gordon (born 16 May 1998) is a Northern Irish footballer who plays as a midfielder for NIFL Premiership side Larne. He has previously played for Sheffield United, Motherwell, Stalybridge Celtic, Partick Thistle and Queen of the South.

Career

Sheffield United
Gordon began his career with Sheffield United, signing his first professional contract in May 2016.

On 21 September 2016, Gordon joined Stalybridge Celtic on a one-month loan.

Motherwell
On 31 January 2017, Gordon signed for Motherwell, joining up with their U20's team. He went on to make his debut for Motherwell on 5 April 2017, in a 0–0 home draw against rivals Hamilton Academical.

Partick Thistle (loan)
In early July 2018, Gordon joined Partick Thistle on a season-long loan. He scored two goals within the first six minutes of his Thistle debut in a 2–0 win over Stenhousemuir in the Scottish League Cup. Gordon suffered an injury in a League Cup match against Celtic in August which kept him out for most of the season. He made his return for Thistle after being out injured for 8 months in a 3–0 win over Greenock Morton in March. Gordon scored his first league goal for the Jags in a 1–0 win away to Ayr United on 23 April.

Partick Thistle
On 15 May 2019, Gordon joined Partick Thistle on a permanent basis, with the move to be completed in July, signing a two-year contract.
After staying with the club following their relegation to League One, Gordon scored his first goal of the season, opening the scoring in a 2-0 away win in the league against Forfar Athletic.

After winning the League One title with Thistle, Gordon signed a one year extension with Thistle.

Gordon scored his first goal of the 2021–22 season, scoring the fourth goal in a 4-0 away win over Ayr United.

Queen of the South (loan)
On 13 January 2022, Gordon signed for fellow Scottish Championship club Queen of the South on loan until the end of the 2021–22 season.

Larne
In June 2022 Gordon returned to Northern Ireland, signing for NIFL Premiership side Larne.

Career statistics

Honours

Club

Partick Thistle
Scottish League One: 2020–21

Larne

County Antrim Shield: 2022-23

References

1998 births
Living people
Association footballers from Northern Ireland
Scottish Professional Football League players
Dungannon Swifts F.C. players
Sheffield United F.C. players
Stalybridge Celtic F.C. players
Motherwell F.C. players
Partick Thistle F.C. players
Queen of the South F.C. players
Association football midfielders
Larne F.C. players